Willimantic may refer to:

 Willimantic, Connecticut, village of Windham, in Windham County, Connecticut, United States
 Willimantic, Maine, town in Piscataquis County, Maine, United States
 USS Willimantic (ID-3549), United States Navy cargo ship
 Willimantic River,  a tributary of the Shetucket River